The Shade of the Sinking Plain is a 1984 fantasy role-playing game adventure published by North Pole Publications for the Rolemaster role-playing game.

Plot summary
The Shade of the Sinking Plain is an adventure in which a huge battle barge has been looting and sinking smaller ships on the rivers of a swamp.

Reception
Jeff Ong reviewed The Shade of the Sinking Plain in Space Gamer No. 72. Ong commented that "Shade of the Sinking Plain sells for nearly as much as some RPGs cost [...] Unless you are a hardcode hack-and-slasher, try the ICE Rolemaster modules instead, and don't waste your time and money."

References

Role-playing game supplements introduced in 1984
Rolemaster supplements